Blair is an unincorporated community in Logan County, West Virginia, United States, on the Spruce Fork. Blair lies along West Virginia Route 17.

Geography

Blair is located in the headwaters of Spruce Fork of Little Coal River at the foot of Blair Mountain. Blair Mountain separates the communities of Blair, Sharples, and Clothier from the bulk of Logan County.

References

External links 
 The Battle for Blair Mountain (2010) for information on past and present conflicts at Blair Mountain

Unincorporated communities in Logan County, West Virginia
Unincorporated communities in West Virginia
Coal towns in West Virginia